Kopychyntsi is a small city in Chortkiv Raion, Ternopil Oblast, Ukraine.  It hosts the administration of Kopychyntsi urban hromada, one of the hromadas of Ukraine. Kopychyntsi is the birthplace of Vasyl Ivanchuk, a chess grandmaster; Israel Jacob Kligler, who led the effort of eradicating malaria in Mandatory Palestine; and Pinhas Lavon, an Israeli politician. Population:

History
The city was first mentioned in 1340 as a village in the Polish powiat (county) of Terebovlia. With time it grew to become a town within the Land of Halicz, itself part of Podole Voivodeship of Poland and then the Polish–Lithuanian Commonwealth. It was granted a city charter in 1564. In late 1648, during the Khmelnytsky Uprising, a combined Cossack and Tartar army under Asand Demko seized the town. However, following the Battle of Kopychyntsi of May 12, 1651, in which the enemy forces were defeated by hetman Marcin Kalinowski, it returned to Poland.

In the effect of the Treaty of Buchach of 1672 the town was ceded to Ottoman Empire, but it returned to Poland after the Treaty of Karlowitz of 1699. Following the Partitions of Poland it became part of Austrian Empire and was then seized by Napoleon Bonaparte who gave it to Russian Empire in the Treaty of Tilsit of 1807. Russian control however ended with the Congress of Vienna which awarded the area back to Austria. It shared the history of the surrounding lands of the Kingdom of Galicia and Lodomeria for the rest of the 19th century.

Following World War I the area was disputed between Poland and the West Ukrainian People's Republic (ZUNR) in what became known as the Polish-Ukrainian War. In June 1919, during the Chortkiv offensive, the 1st Galician Corps of the ZUNR under Osyp Mykytka seized the town, but it was retaken by Polish forces under Józef Haller the following month. Following the Treaty of Riga the town was officially restored to Poland. It was made a seat of a separate powiat within Tarnopol Voivodeship and a garrison town of a Border Protection Corps battalion Kopyczyńce.

Following the September Campaign of 1939 and the outbreak of World War II, the town was occupied first by the Soviet Union and then Nazi Germany. According to the Soviet Extraordinary Commission, approximately 8,000 Jews were killed in Kopychyntsi during the war. After the war it was annexed by the USSR, and since 1991 is part of independent Ukraine.

Until 18 July 2020, Kopychyntsi belonged to Husiatyn Raion. The raion was abolished in July 2020 as part of the administrative reform of Ukraine, which reduced the number of raions of Ternopil Oblast to three. The area of Husiatyn Raion was merged into Chortkiv Raion.

Religion

Houses of worship
 Ukrainian Greek Catholic Church of the Exaltation of the Holy Cross and bell tower (1630), located at Kutets
 Church of St. Nicholas on the Mount (1900), architect Vasyl Nahirny
 Roman Catholic Church of the Assumption of Mary (1802) in the center of the town
 Synagogue

Attractions 
 People's House, Kopychyntsi
 Park near the pool, founded in the 18th century; 
 Castle (lost).

Notable people 
 Vasyl Ivanchuk, Ukrainian chess grandmaster
 Israel Jacob Kligler, Israeli microbiologist 
 Mefodiy (Kudriakov)
 Adam Obrubański, Polish football player and manager
 Roman Hubczenko, Polish actor 
 Franciszek Slawski, Polish linguist 
 Pinhas Lavon, Israeli politician best known for the Lavon Affair
 Mike Mazurki, Ukrainian-American actor

People associated with Kopychyntsi 
 Adam Mikołaj Sieniawski

References

External links 

  Сайт Копичинців
 
 

Cities in Ternopil Oblast
Tarnopol Voivodeship
Cities of district significance in Ukraine
Holocaust locations in Ukraine